Tommy Bolin and Friends: Great Gypsy Soul, often referred to as simply Great Gypsy Soul, is a double tribute album to former Deep Purple guitarist Tommy Bolin. Released on March 26, 2012, the album contains newly recorded music from original outtakes and alternative versions, with several modern musicians and singers performing singing on top of the original multi-tracks along with Bolin and his band. All tracks contain Bolin's original guitar work and vocals. Additional performers include Joe Bonamassa, Nels Cline, Peter Frampton, Warren Haynes, Glenn Hughes, Myles Kennedy, Sonny Landreth, Steve Lukather, Steve Morse, Oz Noy, Prairie Prince, John Scofield, Big Sugar, Derek Trucks and Brad Whitford.

Track listing 

All tracks written by Tommy Bolin, except where noted.

Disc One
 The Grind (Tommy Bolin, John Tesar, Jeff Cook, Stanley Sheldon) / Guest Artist: Peter Frampton
 Teaser (Bolin, Cook) / Guest Artist: Warren Haynes
 Dreamer (Cook) / Guest Artists: Nels Cline, Myles Kennedy
 Savannah Woman (Bolin, Cook) / Guest Artist: John Scofield
 Smooth Fandango / Guest Artist: Derek Trucks
 People, People / Guest Artists: Big Sugar, Gordie Johnson
 Wild Dogs (Bolin, Tesar) / Guest Artist: Brad Whitford
 Homeward Strut / Guest Artist: Steve Lukather
 Sugar Shack (Bolin, Glenn Hughes) / Guest Artists: Glenn Hughes, Sonny Landreth
 Crazed Fandango / Guest Artist: Steve Morse
 Lotus (Bolin, Tesar) / Guest Artists: Glenn Hughes, Joe Bonamassa, Nels Cline

Disc Two
 Flying Fingers / Guest Artists: Nels Cline, Oz Noy
 Marching Bag Movement 1 / Guest Artists: Greg Hampton, John Scofield, Nels Cline, Sonny Landreth
 Marching Bag Movement 2 / Guest Artists: Derek Trucks, Peter Frampton, Nels Cline, Steve Lukather
 Marching Bag Movement 3 / Guest Artists: Gordie Johnson, Joe Bonamassa, Nels Cline, Steve Lukather, Oz Noy, Steve Morse
 Marching Bag Movement 4 / Guest Artists: Brad Whitford, Joe Bonamassa, Nels Cline, Oz Noy, Peter Frampton, Warren Haynes

References

External links

Tribute albums
2012 compilation albums
Deep Purple